Geary is a small crofting township, of some 40 houses, located on the remote northeast coast of the Waternish peninsula, overlooking the sea loch Loch Snizort,  on the island of Skye, Scotland. It is in the Scottish council area of Highland.

It is adjacent to Gillen and Knockbreck with Halistra about  further west along a single-track road.

References

Populated places in the Isle of Skye